Kajraare is a 2010 Indian Hindi-language film directed by Pooja Bhatt, starring Himesh Reshammiya and Sara Loren in the lead roles. Reshammiya plays a singer who falls in love with a bar dancer and the film is centred on how they find true love. It is the first Hindi film to be shot in Petra, often called "the eighth wonder of the world."

Plot
Rajiv Bhel (Himesh Reshammiya) is haunted by his very own past which torments him. He moves to Jordan where he has a job as a bartender, however Avtaar Singh forbids him to stay and immediately wants him to return to India. Rajiv then contemplates suicide but the eyes of a ravishing beauty strikes his own eyes. A chase ensues, until another man appears and takes the "beauty" in his own hands. The guy tells Rajiv if he wants to see what she does, he must come to the bar to "watch her dance".

Rajiv visits the aquarium and he sees the lady again and develops immense love for her. The woman is Nargis who is revealed as a prostitute. He then falls in love. One night, Rajiv visits the "bar", and watches her (Nargis) dance. Embarrassed and feeling unworthy, Rajiv runs away, however, after the end of the night, its time to head home. Nargis and her colleagues get in a taxi which Rajiv follows. At the end of the trip, Rajiv gets closer to Nargis only for Rajiv to return the scarf that Nargis dropped at the bar. Mockingly, Nargis refuses it but Rajiv says if she keeps disappearing like this, he will hang himself with the scarf. Nargis offers for a longer one in a jokingly way.

Regardless, Rajiv wants to marry Nargis. Rajiv wants Nargis to be free from prostitution. Rajiv must now get past Zohra Baano. She owns a prostitution business and hires other women to do their dirty work, the only source of income. Zohra Baano wants a price in exchange and Rajiv is willing to do that. Slowly, Nargis begins to develop feelings for Rajiv. One night, Nargis escapes the brothel, Rajiv finds her and takes her to a hotel. Nargis realises this was a mistake so she must return to the brothel. As soon as the "couple" leave the hotel, 3 drunkards approach them and one of them recognizes Rajiv as "Rocky". In fact, this is his real name, although "Rajiv" denies it. Rajiv fights off the drunkards and realises that Nargis knows the truth. So he decides to come clean about his life story.

Rocky Desai (also Himesh Reshammiya), a singer, is on the aeroplane. An ardent boy, who's a fan of Rocky, and his granny wants an autograph so Rocky writes one for them. On the plane, an uneasy passenger heads for the restroom but he is a terrorist. He threatens the entire crew, until Rocky sees this. He gets into a fight but suddenly the gun goes off killing the terrorist. Avtaar tells Rocky, he just killed Babbar's brother. Babbar is a most-wanted terrorist. He vows revenge on Rocky. Avtaar recommends Rocky to change his identity and start afresh. And this is how Rocky becomes Rajiv.

Rajiv breaks Avtaar's oath by going back to UK. He's playing with his sister in the park until he receives a call. It is Avtaar who wants him to return to London (as a cover up) Babbar is targeting his sister. After the call, his sister is gone. The white woman who witnessed the event says a man just took her. Babbar then tells Rocky he's sister is dead. This shatters him completely.

What follows is the underlying quest for true love. At the climax, Babbar captures Zohra Baano and Nargis. Rajiv / Rocky rescues them and kills Babbar. At the end, they are married.

Cast
 Himesh Reshammiya as Rajiv Behl / Rocky Desai
 Sara Loren as Nargis (Mona Lizza)
 Amrita Singh as Zohra Baano
 Natasha Sinha as Nargis (Mona Lizza)'s mother
 Gaurav Chanana as Sadiq - Dead
 Javed Sheikh as Tariq Anwar
 Gulshan Grover as Avtaar Singh - Dead
 Anupam Shyam as  Nawaz - Dead
 Adnan Shah as Babur Altaf Khan - Dead
 Ahsan Baksh
 Loveena Lodh
 Mohammed Kazi
 Rachel Gurjar
 Veeru Krishnan

Release
The film was supposed to be released on 6 August 2010, along with Aisha, but due to clashes between director Pooja Bhatt and the producer, Bhushan Kumar, the release was delayed. According to sources, Kumar later sold the satellite rights to a television channel, which wanted it to have an official theatrical release before they could air it. On 15 October 2010, the film was released in only two theatres in Mumbai.
Bhushan Kumar stated in an interview that the film will release worldwide on the TV channel Colors in December 2010.

The film was previewed on UTV Movies on 28 May 2011. The Film was also previewed on Star Gold Channel.

Home media
The DVDs and VCDs of Kajraare were released by Eros in the first week of December 2010.

Soundtrack
The soundtrack of Kajraare was released on 30 May 2010. The album has 7 tracks and 4 remixes. All songs are composed and sung by Himesh Reshammiya with lyrics by Sameer.

Track listing

References

External links
 

T-Series (company) films
2010 films
Films scored by Himesh Reshammiya
2010s Hindi-language films
Films shot in Jordan
Films set in Pakistan
Films set in Jordan
Films about prostitution in India
Films set in Lahore
Films set in Punjab, Pakistan
Films shot in Dubai
Films shot in Morocco
Films shot in Pakistan
Films shot in Lahore
Films shot in Punjab, Pakistan